The Laron Wizard is an American homebuilt aircraft produced by Laron Aviation Tech of Borger, Texas. When it was available the aircraft was supplied as a kit for amateur construction.

Design and development
The Wizard features a strut-braced high-wing, a twin-boom tail layout, a two-seats-in-side-by-side configuration enclosed cockpit, fixed tricycle landing gear, with a tail skid, and a single engine in pusher configuration.

The aircraft is made from a combination of bolted-together aluminum tubing and fiberglass, with its flying surfaces covered doped aircraft fabric. The wing is supported by a single lift strut and jury strut per side.

The manufacturer estimated the construction time from the supplied kit as 450 hours.

Operational history
By 1998 the company reported that 240 kits had been sold and 220 aircraft were completed and flying.

Specifications (Wizard)

See also
Ultralite Soaring Wizard, a different aircraft with the same model name

References

External links
Photo of a Wizard

Wizard
1990s United States sport aircraft
1990s United States ultralight aircraft
1990s United States civil utility aircraft
Single-engined pusher aircraft
High-wing aircraft
Homebuilt aircraft
Twin-boom aircraft